Ring Racer, stylized as Ring°racer, is a Formula One-themed roller coaster which was due to open on August 15, 2009 at the Nürburgring race course as part of the Nürburgring 2009 project.

However, two defects in the launch system delayed its opening until 2013. On 3 September 2009, engineers attempted to raise the ride to its full and intended speed as it had been testing at a lower power, however this caused a series of explosions in the pneumatic system and caused injuries to seven people, and shattered multiple windows in the nearby buildings.

It was manufactured by S&S - Sansei  and features a pneumatic launch. This accelerates the coaster from 0– in less than 2 seconds, double the acceleration of a Formula 1 driver in the same period of time.

According to the local state, Rhineland-Palatinate, the cost of Ring Racer accumulated to a total of 12.3 million Euro.

In 2014, it was announced by Nürburgring that Ring Racer wouldn't start running again as the ride is not economically viable.

See also
 2013 in amusement parks

References

External links
 
RCDB Page

Roller coasters in Germany